Bucanetes is a genus of passerine  birds in the finch family. It contains two species:

The genus name is from Ancient Greek bukanetes, "trumpeter".

References

 
Bird genera
Taxonomy articles created by Polbot